Robert Rutherford may refer to:

 Robert Rutherford (congressman) (1728–1803), American pioneer, soldier and statesman, United States Representative from Virginia 1793–97
 Robert Rutherford (cricketer) (1886-1960), New Zealand cricketer
 Robert L. Rutherford (1938–2013), United States Air Force general
 Bob Rutherford (born 1878), English footballer
 Bob Rutherford (clinician) (died 1995), former chairman of Newcastle United F. C.
 Robert B. Rutherford (1931–2013), American vascular surgeon and physician